Jericho Governmental Hospital is a government hospital in the Jericho city, West Bank, Palestine. Followed by the Palestinian Ministry of Health. It was built in 1998 and has 54 beds. It employs 187 staff, including a doctor, nurse, pharmacist, physiotherapist, laboratory technician, radiologist and others.

References 

Hospitals in the State of Palestine